Guns is the fifth and most recent studio album by English rock band Cardiacs. It was recorded and mixed at Apollo 8 in London and released in 1999. After a brief period of unavailability, the album was re-pressed in August 2007.

Music 
Compared to other Cardiacs releases, Guns is often considered to be the band's most accessible album. A reviewer for Echoes and Dust describes the album as "Rock’n’Roll with more than a touch of the baroque" and as having "a very intimate feel." The musical style present on Guns has been compared to the music of Spratleys Japs, a side project that features Cardiacs band leader Tim Smith and Guns guest vocalist Joanne Spratley.

Despite being considered relatively accessible for Cardiacs, a few tracks on Guns are among the most intricate compositions that the band released. For example, the end of the fifth track, "Jitterbug (junior is a)," had Tim Smith using several pieces of paper in order to keep track of his ideas instead of his self-imposed limit of one. According to Tim Smith, "I used to score it all out on reams and reams of paper like a twat, but nowadays I limit myself to one bit of paper just as reminders (as my memory is crap). Although one song on the ‘Guns’ album had me doing the ‘reams and reams of paper’ thing, it had to be done, there was no other way. I sat there for 36 hours solid and didn’t stop until it sort of brought itself to its end and when I looked back at it I wondered where the fuck it had come from because I couldn’t remember doing it."

Themes
Guns features several of the lyrical themes typical of Cardiacs, including dogs (cover art, tracks 6 and 12) and dirtiness (tracks 7, 8, 9, and 12). In addition, Guns also introduces several new themes that appear throughout the album and in future works. There is a clear fixation on eyes (tracks 4, 5, 6, 8, 9, 10), with the repeated line "brand them in the eye" present in "Cry Wet Smile Dry" and "Ain't He Messy Though," as well as in later works. Lambs, often "innocent lambs," also make frequent appearances (tracks 3, 7, 8, and 10).

Some of the lyrics seem to have been written using 'found' text and the cut-up technique. One known source is the 1955 film The Night of the Hunter, which provides seemingly all of "Clean That Evil Mud out Your Soul" including the song's title; its chorus, for example, uses "Merciful heaven only knows what unholy sights and sounds all we innocent babes has made in them dens," adapted from "Oh, heaven only knows what unholy sights and sounds them innocent babes has heard in the dens of perdition where she dragged 'em." Several lines from "Wind and Rains Is Cold," including the song's title, also originate from the film. For example, the line "Hide your hair it's waving all lazy and soft like meadow grass under the flood" is adapted from the line "With her hair wavin' soft and lazy like meadow grass under flood water." Cardiacs references to The Night of the Hunter are not unique to this album; notably, the cover from their previous album, Sing to God, also takes inspiration from the film.

Another notable lyrical source is the celebrated Portuguese to English phrasebook English as She Is Spoke, which is well-known for its inaccurate and often humorous attempts at translation. "Cry Wet Smile Dry" borrows heavily from the "Familiar Dialogues" section of the book, featuring direct quotes from the subsections "For make a visit in the morning," "For to see the town," and especially from "For to write." The song "Sleep All Eyes Open" uses quotes from the subsections "For make a visit in the morning" and "The weather," but also borrows several lines from the "Familiar phrases" section, including the lines "You mistake you-self heavily" and "That may dead if I lie you." English as She Is Spoke is a lyrical source shared by Pony, an album released the same year as Guns by Cardiacs side project Spratleys Japs.

Track listing
All songs written by Tim Smith. Riffs and arrangements by Jon Poole and Tim Smith, and additional lyrics by Bob Leith.

"Will Bleed Amen" contains a hidden track titled "Secret Like Swans" which begins after 50 seconds of silence.

Personnel
Tim Smith – lead vocals, guitar, keyboards
Jim Smith – bass, vocals
Jon Poole – guitar, keyboards, vocals
Bob Leith – drums

Additional personnel
Sarah Smith – saxophone, vocals (tracks 1 and 3)
Joanne Spratley – vocals (tracks 6 and 7)
Sharron Saddington – vocals (tracks 1, 3, 8 and 12)
Rob Deschamps – trombone, French Horn
String quartet:
Chris Brierly
Catherine Morgan
Mark Pharaoh
Robert Woolard

External links
"Cardiacs website".

References

Cardiacs albums
1999 albums